Berezovka is a rural locality (a selo) in Lopukhovskoye Rural Settlement, Rudnyansky District, Volgograd Oblast, Russia. The population was 45 as of 2010.

Geography 
Berezovka is located in steppe, on the right bank of the Medveditsa River, 26 km southwest of Rudnya (the district's administrative centre) by road. Ushinka is the nearest rural locality.

References 

Rural localities in Rudnyansky District, Volgograd Oblast